Le Rhône was the name given to a series of popular rotary aircraft engines produced in France by Société des Moteurs Le Rhône and the successor company of Gnome et Rhône. They powered a number of military aircraft types of the First World War. Le Rhône engines were also produced under license worldwide. 

Although not powerful (the largest wartime version produced ), they were dependable rotary engines. The Le Rhône 9 was a development of the Le Rhône 7, a seven-cylinder design. Examples of nine-cylinder Le Rhône rotary engines are on public display in aviation museums with several remaining airworthy, powering vintage aircraft types.

Operation
In most respects the Le Rhône engines were typical rotary engines, so that the crankshaft remained stationary in operation, with the entire crankcase and its attached cylinders rotating around it as a unit.

The copper induction tubes had their crankcase ends located in different places on the  versions; the 80 hp versions had them entering the crankcase in a location forward of the vertical center-line of each cylinder, while the 110 hp version had them located behind the cylinder's center-line. This resulted in the 80 hp version's intake plumbing being "fully visible" from the front, while the 110 hp version had the lower ends of its intake tubes seemingly "hidden" behind the cylinders.

A complicated slipper bearing system was used in the Le Rhône engine. The master rod was of a split-type, which permitted assembly of the connecting rods. It also employed three concentric grooves, designed to accept slipper bearings from the other cylinders. The other connecting  rods used inner-end bronze shoes, which were shaped to fit in the grooves. The master rod was numbered as number one and the shoes of numbers two, five and eight rode in the outer groove, the shoes of three, six and nine in the middle groove and four and seven in the inner groove. Although this system was complex, the Le Rhône engines worked very well.

The Le Rhône engines used an unconventional valve actuation system, with a single centrally-pivoting rocker arm moving the exhaust valve and the intake valve. When the arm moved down it opened the intake valve and when it moved up it opened the exhaust valve. To make this system work a two-way push-pull rod was fitted, instead of the more conventional one-way pushrod. This feature required the cam followers to incorporate a positive action, a function designed in by using a combination of links and levers. This design prevented valve overlap and so limited power output, but as the engine structure and cooling arrangements would not have been adequate at a higher power output, this should not be considered a significant design fault.

Production
As well as production by Société des Moteurs Gnome et Rhône, which had bought out Société des Moteurs Le Rhône in 1914, the Le Rhône was produced in Germany (by Motorenfabrik Oberursel), Austria, the United Kingdom (by Daimler), Russian Empire and Sweden.

 le Rhône  engines were made under license in the United States by Union Switch and Signal of Pennsylvania, and the  Oberursel Ur.II rotary engine used by Germany in World War I, in such famous fighters such as the Fokker Dr.I triplane, was a close copy of the  le Rhône 9J version.

Variants
Data from : 

Le Rhône Type 7A
(1910)  , seven-cylinder rotary engine — twenty built for use on Borel Monoplanes and Sommer Biplanes.
Le Rhône Type 7B
(1911) , seven-cylinder rotary engine — Thirty-five prototype engines built.
Le Rhône Type 7B2
(1912) , seven-cylinder rotary engine — 350 built at Societe Moteurs le Rhône.
Le Rhône Type 7Z
40hp
Le Rhône Type 9C

(1916) , nine-cylinder rotary engine.
Le Rhône Type 9J

(1913) , nine-cylinder rotary engine.
Le Rhône Type 9Ja

(1915) , nine-cylinder rotary engine.
Le Rhône Type 9Jb

(1916) , nine-cylinder rotary engine.
Le Rhône Type 9Jby

(1916) , nine-cylinder rotary engine.

Le Rhône Type 9R
(1916)  /  9-cylinder rotary.
Le Rhône 9Z
(1920) A  9-cylinder rotary.
Le Rhône 11F
(1913) A  11-cylinder rotary.
Le Rhône 14D
(1912) A  two-row rotary, consisting of two seven-cylinder rows rotating round a single two-throw crankshaft. 
Le Rhône 18E (1912)
(1912) A  two-row rotary, consisting of two nine-cylinder rows rotating round a single two-throw crankshaft. 
Le Rhône 18E (1917)
(1917) A  two-row rotary, consisting of two 9R rows rotating round a single two-throw crankshaft. 
Le Rhône 28E
(1918) A  four-row rotary, consisting of four seven-cylinder rows rotating round a single four-throw crankshaft. 
Le Rhône K
(1916) A 9-cylinder rotary prototype engine.
Le Rhône L
(1916) A 9-cylinder rotary prototype engine.
Le Rhône M
(1917) A 9-cylinder rotary engine produced in small quantities.
Le Rhône P
(1917) A 9-cylinder rotary prototype engine.
Le Rhône R
(1917) A 9-cylinder rotary prototype engine.
Oberursel Ur.II
A clone of the Le Rhône 9J
Oberursel Ur.III
An 11 cylinder German development of the Ur.II (Le Rhône 9J).

Oberursel licence production
Oberursel produced the 110 hp model, supposedly without authorization in Germany. The Oberursel Ur.II was a licensed copy of the Le Rhône, but imported or captured Le Rhônes were preferred over the Oberursel due to tighter manufacturing tolerances with the French product. However, by July 1918 there was a shortage in Germany of castor oil, a plant-based lubricant that the rotaries required, as it didn't dissolve easily into the fuel and because its heat tolerance and lubrication qualities were superior to available mineral oils. A new Voltol-based lubricant, derived from mineral oil, was substituted and was blamed for engine failures on German fighters such as the Fokker E.V, which used the Oberursel Ur.II. It has been claimed that without castor oil, the Le Rhône rotary would have been equally failure-prone.

An Oberursel reproduction was manufactured by The Vintage Aviator Company in New Zealand in limited numbers by reverse engineering an original Oberursal engine, for their own project aircraft.

Le Rhônes still flying today
Several enthusiasts are using original Le Rhône engines for World War I replica aircraft today.  A flying example can be seen at the Pioneer Flight Museum, Kingsbury Texas in a replica Fokker Dr 1. pioneerflightmuseum.org  The engine had previously been flown in an original Thomas Morse Scout, which is now under restoration with another Le Rhône 80 hp engine planned for that flying aircraft. There are other reproductions of Dr 1's flying original Le Rhône engines, as well as the restored Thomas Morse Scouts in the United States.

Applications

 Adamoli-Cattani fighter
 Airco DH.5
 Avro 504
 Beardmore W.B.III
 Bristol M.1
 Bristol Scout
 Caudron C.27
 Caudron G.3
 Caudron G.4
 Cierva C.6, (autogyro)
 Fokker D.VI
 Fokker D.VIII
 Fokker Dr.I
 Hanriot HD.1
 Hanriot HD.14
 Macchi M.14
 Morane-Saulnier N
 Morane-Saulnier BB
 Morane-Saulnier AI (trainers)
 Mosca MB 2 bis
 Nielsen & Winther Type AA
 Nieuport 10
 Nieuport 11 and 16
 Nieuport 17, 21 & 23
 Nieuport 24, 24bis and 27
 Nieuport 31
 Nieuport 80, 81 and 83
 Sikorsky S-16
 Sopwith Camel 
 Sopwith Pup
 SPAD S.A.2 & 4
 Spijker V.1 
 Spijker V.2 
 Standard E-1
 Thomas-Morse S-4C
 Thulin E
 TNCA Serie E Sonora, Tololoche, and México

See also
Clerget aircraft engines
Gnome Monosoupape
Gnome et Rhône

References

Notes

Bibliography

 Gunston, Bill. World Encyclopedia of Aero Engines. Cambridge, England. Patrick Stephens Limited, 1989.

External links

Oberursel UR-II Rotary Engine.

Air-cooled aircraft piston engines
1910s aircraft piston engines
Gnome-Rhône aircraft engines
Rotary aircraft piston engines